The  Bemidji Axemen season was the team's second and final season as a professional indoor football franchise and second in the Indoor Football League (IFL). One of ten teams competing in the IFL for the 2015 season, the Bemidji, Minnesota-based Axemen are members of the United Conference.

Schedule
Key:

Pre-season

Regular season
All start times are local time

Roster

Standings

References

External links
Bemidji Axemen official statistics
Bemidji Axemen at The Bemidji Pioneer

Bemidji Axemen
Bemidji Axemen
Bemidji Axemen